Collection: The Shrapnel Years is a compilation album by guitarist Tony MacAlpine, released on March 14, 2006 through Shrapnel Records. It includes tracks from six of MacAlpine's studio albums.

Track listing

Personnel
Tony MacAlpine – guitar, keyboard (except track 7), production
Jens Johansson – keyboard (track 7)
Steve Smith – drums (tracks 1–4, 11, 12), production
Mike Terrana – drums (tracks 5, 9, 10)
Glen Sobel – drums (track 6) production
Deen Castronovo – drums (tracks 7, 8)
Billy Sheehan – bass (tracks 1–4)
Larry Dennison – bass (tracks 5, 6), production
Tony Franklin – bass (tracks 7–10)
Barry Sparks – bass (tracks 11, 12)
Mike Varney – production
Robert Margouleff – production
Brian Levi – production
Steve Fontano – production

References

External links
Session Notes: Collection - The Shrapnel Years at tonymacalpine.com (archived)
In Review: Tony MacAlpine "Collection: The Shrapnel Years" at Guitar Nine Records

Tony MacAlpine albums
2006 greatest hits albums
Albums produced by Mike Varney